NGC 4731 is a barred spiral galaxy located near the Virgo supercluster. To its celestial south lies NGC 4731A, a small irregular galaxy. Both galaxies feature high concentrations of neutral HI gas. It is theorized that its elongated arm structure could be related to gravitational interactions with a nearby galaxy, NGC 4967. It is a member of the NGC 4697 Group of galaxies, which is a member of the Virgo II Groups, a series of galaxies and galaxy clusters strung out from the southern edge of the Virgo Supercluster.

See also
New General Catalogue

References 

4731
Virgo (constellation)
Barred spiral galaxies
Virgo Supercluster